R370 road may refer to:
 R370 road (Ireland)
 R370 road (South Africa)